= Parivartan Sandesh Foundation =

Indian non-governmental organisation

Parivartan Sandesh Foundation is an Indian non-governmental organisation based in New Delhi that works for the betterment and development of deprived and marginalised communities through promoting various programs to ensure access to education and health services, empowering adolescents through vocational skills and spreading awareness of social issues. It was established in 2010.

The mission of the foundation is to promote sustainable social change by improving the living conditions of vulnerable populations, especially children; to act upon the causes of poverty and inequality by influencing public policy, and to identify and work alongside the economically and socially deprived- starting with children, so that they become educated, skilled and aware.

Parivartan Sandesh Launched the project Saksham Nari, Sashakt Samaj with the objective to provide unemployed women with more skills through training and capacity building.

On 6 July 2016, Parivartan Sandesh Foundation in association with the Tihar administration organised a painting competition for the kids of women inmates of Tihar Central Jail.

In July 2015, the foundation started a scholarship programme, known as Samarth, to financially assist student with their higher education.
